The Russian famine of 1921–1922, also known as the Povolzhye famine, was a severe famine in the Russian Soviet Federative Socialist Republic that began early in the spring of 1921 and lasted until 1922. The famine resulted from the combined effects of economic disturbance from the Russian Revolution, the Russian Civil War, and the government policy of war communism (especially prodrazvyorstka). It was exacerbated by rail systems that could not distribute food efficiently.

The famine killed an estimated five million people and primarily affected the Volga and Ural River regions. Some of the starving resorted to cannibalism.

Origins 

Before the famine began, Russia had suffered three-and-a-half years of World War I and the Russian Civil War of 1918–1920, many of the conflicts being fought inside Russia.  There were an estimated 7–12 million casualties during the Russian Civil War, mostly civilians.

Before the famine, all sides in the Russian Civil Wars of 1918–1921 (the Bolsheviks, the Whites, the Anarchists, and the seceding nationalities) had provisioned themselves by seizing food from those who grew it, giving it to their armies and supporters, and denying it to their enemies. The Bolshevik government had requisitioned supplies from the peasantry for little or nothing in exchange, which led peasants to drastically reduce their crop production.

Aid from outside Soviet Russia was initially rejected. The American Relief Administration (ARA), which Herbert Hoover formed to help the victims of starvation of World War I, offered assistance to Lenin in 1919 if it had full say over the Russian railway network and handed out food impartially to all. Lenin refused that as interference in Russian internal affairs.

Lenin was eventually convinced by the famine, the Kronstadt rebellion, large-scale peasant uprisings such as the Tambov Rebellion, and the failure of a German general strike to reverse his policy at home and abroad. He decreed the New Economic Policy on 15 March 1921.

The famine also helped produce an opening to the West. Lenin now allowed relief organizations to bring aid. War relief was no longer required in Western Europe, and the ARA had an organization set up in Poland that relieved the Polish famine, which had begun in the winter of 1919–1920.

Scope and duration 

The early 1920s saw a series of famines. The first famine in the Soviet Union happened in 1921–1923 and garnered wide international attention. The most affected area being the southeastern areas of European Russia, including the Volga region. An estimated 16 million people may have been affected, and up to 5 million died.

Relief effort 

In the summer of 1921, during one of the worst famines in history, Vladimir Lenin, the head of the new Soviet government, along with Maxim Gorky, appealed in an open letter to "all honest European and American people" to "give bread and medicine". In an open letter to all nations, dated 13 July 1921, Gorky described the crop failure which had brought his country to the brink of starvation. Herbert Hoover, who would later become the U.S. President, responded immediately, and negotiations with Russia took place at the Latvian capital, Riga. A European effort was led by the famous Arctic explorer Fridtjof Nansen through the International Committee for Russian Relief (ICRR).

Hoover's ARA had already been distributing food aid throughout Europe since 1914. After the Germans invaded Belgium in 1914, Hoover set up the Belgian Relief Committee to alleviate the devastation and starvation that followed. As World War I expanded, the ARA grew, and it next entered northern France and assisted France and Germany from 1914 to 1919. In 1920 and 1921, it provided one meal a day to 3.2 million children in Finland, Estonia, various Russian regions, Latvia, Lithuania, Poland, Ukraine, Czechoslovakia, Austria, Hungary, and Armenia. When it began its emergency feeding operation in Russia, it planned to feed about one million Russian children for a full year. Other bodies such as the American Friends Service Committee, the British Friends' War Victims Relief Committee and the International Save the Children Union, with the British  Save the Children Fund as the major contributor, also later took part. As the historian Douglas Smith writes, the food relief would likely help "save communist Russia from ruin."

The United States was the first country to respond, with Hoover appointing Colonel William N. Haskell to direct the American Relief Administration (ARA) in Russia. Within a month, ships loaded with food were headed for Russia. The main contributor to the international relief effort would be the ARA, which was founded and directed by Hoover. It had agreed to provide food for a million people, mostly children, but within a year it was feeding more than 10 times that number daily.

The ARA insisted on complete autonomy as to how the food would be distributed and stated its requirement that food would be given without regard to "race, creed or social status," a condition that was stated in Section 25 of the Riga agreement. U.S. spokesmen said that it would also want to have storage facilities built in Russia, wrote the journalist Charles Bartlett, and would expect to have full access to those to assure that food was distributed properly.

Hoover also demanded for Russia to use some of its gold holdings to defray the cost of the relief effort. He secured $18 million from the Russian leadership, $20 million from the U.S. Congress, $8 million from the U.S. military, and additional money from U.S. charities to arrive at a total of approximately $78 million from all those sources. After an agreement was finally signed at Riga, the U.S. set up its first kitchen in Petrograd, where 1.6 million people had already starved to death.

Over 10 million people were fed daily, with the bulk of food coming from the ARA, which had provided more than 768 million tons of flour, grain, rice, beans, pork, milk, and sugar, with a value at the time of over $98 million. In order to transport and distribute the food after it was collected in the U.S., the ARA used 237 ships, under the direction of 200 Americans and with the help of 125,000 Russians on location for unloading, warehousing, hauling, weighing, cooking and serving the food in more than 21,000 newly-established kitchens.

However, even after the food had reached the people in need, Colonel Haskell, informed Hoover of an unexpected new danger. He explained that fuel was unavailable for heating or cooking, and millions of Russian peasants had clothing consisting mostly of rags, which would lead to certain death from cold exposure during the approaching winter.

The children at risk included those in orphanages and other institutions, as they usually had only one garment, often made of flour sacks, and they lacked shoes, stockings, underclothing, or any other clothing to keep warm. Also at risk were children living at home with their parents, who also lacked enough clothing, which made them unable to reach the American relief kitchens. Haskell cabled Hoover that at least one million children were in extreme need of clothes. In response, Hoover quickly initiated a plan for collecting and sending clothing packages to Russia, which would come from donations by individuals, businesses, and banks. 

Medical needs were also paramount. As noted by Dr. Henry Beeuwkes, the chief of the Medical Division in Russia, American relief was supplying over 16,000 hospitals, which were treating more than a million persons daily. Because those institutions were scattered over areas with few railroads and often poor roads, with some hospitals over a thousand miles from the main supply base in Moscow, the task was monumental. Dr. Louis L. Shapiro, an army colonel who was one of the ARA's medical directors in Russia, recalled that southern Russia had little more than "mud ruts for roads, with limitless prairies." On one trip, with few car necessities or regular gas, he drove 150 miles on tires without inner tubes, instead stuffed with straw. "After our kitchens were established and our clinics able to distribute medical supplies," said Shapiro, "children who had been eating a diet of clay and leather scrapings, responded quite rapidly."

According to Dr. Beeuwkes, everything was in short supply, including beds, blankets, sheets, and most medical tools and medicines. Operations were performed in unheated operating rooms without anesthetics and often with bare hands. Wounds were dressed with newspapers or rags. Water supplies were polluted, with much of the plumbing unusable.

To help the widespread medical emergency, the ARA distributed medical supplies, which included over 2,000 different necessities, from medicines to surgical instruments. Overall, there were 125,000 medical packages, weighing 15 million pounds, sent on 69 different ships. According to Dr. Shapiro, when the ARA left Russia in 1923, after two years of relief efforts, "the Russians had been pulled out of the slough of famine and death. I can say without boasting that no relief organization ever worked so hard to complete its task."

In May 1922, Lev Kamenev, President of the Moscow Soviet and deputy chairman of all Russian famine relief committees, wrote a letter to Haskell that thanked him and the ARA for its help and also paid tribute to the American people:

By the summer of 1923, it was estimated that the U.S. relief that was given to Russia amounted to over twice the total of relief given it by all other foreign organizations combined. European agencies co-ordinated by the ICRR also fed two million people a day, while the International Save the Children Union fed up to 375,000. The operation was hazardous since several workers died of cholera, and it was not without its critics, including the London Daily Express, which first denied the severity of the famine and then argued that the money would better be spent in the United Kingdom.

Throughout 1922 and 1923, as famine was still widespread and the ARA was still providing relief supplies, grain was exported by the Soviet government to raise funds for the revival of industry, which seriously endangered Western support for relief. The new Soviet government insisted that if the AYA suspended relief, the ARA was to arrange a foreign loan for them of about $10,000,000 1923 dollars; the ARA was unable to do so and continued to ship in food past the grain being sold abroad.

Death toll 
As with other large-scale famines, the range of estimates is considerable. An official Soviet publication of the early 1920s concluded that about five million deaths occurred in 1921 from famine and related disease, the number that is usually quoted in textbooks. More conservative figures counted not more than a million, and another assessment, based on the ARA's medical division, spoke of two million. On the other side of the scale, some sources spoke of ten million dead. According to Bertrand M. Patenaude, "such a number hardly seems extravagant after the many tens of millions of victims of war, famine, and terror in the twentieth century."

Political uses 
The famine came at the end of six-and-a-half years of unrest and violence (World War I, the two Russian Revolutions of 1917, and the Russian Civil War). Many different political and military factions were involved in those events, and most of them have been accused by their enemies of having contributed to or even bearing sole responsibility for the famine.

The Bolsheviks started a campaign of seizing church property in 1922. That year, over 4.5 million golden roubles of property were seized. Of those, one million gold roubles were spent for famine relief. In a secret March 19, 1922 letter to the Politburo, Lenin expressed an intention to seize several hundred million golden roubles for famine relief.

In Lenin's secret letter to the Politburo, he explains that the famine provides an opportunity against the church. Richard Pipes argued that the famine was used politically as an excuse for the Bolshevik leadership to persecute the Orthodox Church, which held significant sway over much of the peasantry.

Russian anti-Bolshevik white émigrés in London, Paris, and elsewhere also used the famine as a media opportunity to highlight the iniquities of the Soviet regime in an effort to prevent trade with and official recognition of the Bolshevik government.

See also 
 1921 Mari wildfires
 1921–1922 famine in Tatarstan
 Kazakh famine of 1919–1922
 Famines in Russia and the USSR
 Fram (play)
 List of famines
 Pomgol
 Soviet famine of 1932–1933
 Soviet famine of 1946–1947
 American Relief Administration

Notes

References

Sources 
 .
 Cameron, Sarah Isabel. The Hungry Steppe: Soviet Kazakhstan and the Kazakh Famine, 1921–1934 (PhD. Diss. Yale University, 2011).
 Edmondson, Charles M. "The politics of hunger: The Soviet response to famine, 1921". Soviet Studies 29.4 (October 1977): 506–518. .
 Fisher, Harold Henry. The Famine in Soviet Russia, 1919–1923: The Operations of the American Relief Administration (Macmillan, 1927). online
 Fromkin, David: Peace to End All Peace (1989 hc) p. 360 (on Tsarist corruption and the closure of the Dardanelles).
 .
 Jansen, Dinah (2015), "After October: Russian Liberalism as a Work-in Progress, 1917–1945" Kingston, Queen's University.  PhD Dissertation.
 . Default reference for the historical and aftermath sections.
 .
 Patenaude, Bertrand M. The big show in Bololand: The American relief expedition to Soviet Russia in the famine of 1921  (Stanford University Press, 2002).
 
 
 Trotsky, Leon (1930). My Life. Chapter 38.  His advice to Lenin.
 Weissman, Benjamin M. [https://books.google.com/books?id=v_Es-_Jh2qUC Herbert Hoover and famine relief to Soviet Russia, 1921–1923 (Hoover Institution Press, 1974).
 .
 Yakovlev, Alexander N. A Century of Violence in Soviet Russia. Yale University Press, 2002, pp. 155–156 • (famine of 1921)

External links 

 How the U.S. saved a starving Soviet Russia: PBS film highlights Stanford scholar's research on the 1921–1923 famine—A PBS Documentary
 The Great Famine—An American Experience Documentary
 V. A. Polyakov, Hunger in Volga region 1919–1925 (dissertation) 
 Famine in Russia, 1921–1922—University of Warwick
 American food relief to Russia 

1921 in Russia
1922 in Russia
Aftermath of World War I in Russia and in the Soviet Union
Economic crises in Europe
Famines in Russia
Famines in the Soviet Union
20th-century famines